The Last Nataq is a Canadian documentary film, directed by Lisette Marcotte and released in 2019. The film is a portrait of Québécois singer-songwriter Richard Desjardins, exploring both his life and the impact of his upbringing in Rouyn-Noranda on the themes and values expressed in his work.

The film premiered at the Abitibi-Témiscamingue International Film Festival in 2019, and was screened at the 2020 edition of the Rendez-Vous French Film Festival in Vancouver, British Columbia. Due to the COVID-19 pandemic in Quebec, its planned theatrical release in 2020 was delayed, with the film having its commercial opening on April 21, 2021.

References

External links

2019 films
2019 documentary films
Canadian documentary films
Documentary films about singers
Quebec films
French-language Canadian films
2010s Canadian films